Descabezado Grande (also Cerro Azul or Quizapu) is a stratovolcano located in the Maule Region of central Chile. It is capped by a  ice-filled caldera and named for its flat-topped form, as descabezado means "headless" in Spanish.

The volcano is composed of andesite and rhyodacite lava flows along with pyroclastic flow deposits. Along with Cerro Azul,  to the south, it lies at the center of a  volcanic field.

Gallery

See also
List of volcanoes in Chile

References 

 
  (in Spanish; also includes volcanoes of Argentina, Bolivia, and Peru)
 

Volcanoes of Maule Region
Mountains of Chile
Stratovolcanoes of Chile
Active volcanoes
South Volcanic Zone
Pleistocene stratovolcanoes
Holocene stratovolcanoes